Wild Arctic is an animal exhibit featuring beluga whales, walruses, and harbor seals at SeaWorld Orlando.
It was a motion simulation attraction previously at SeaWorld Orlando and SeaWorld San Diego. This attraction replaced Mission: Bermuda Triangle at both locations.

Guests had the option to ride on a non motion gyrostabilized helicopter, completely bypassing the motion simulation. The same video that was played in the motion ride was played in the non motion theater, but watching was optional as guests could walk through the room at any time.

The ride was manufactured by Reflectone. It uses the same motion technology as multi-million dollar commercial and military flight simulation training devices.

In 2019, SeaWorld announced on its Instagram page that the San Diego location would have its final day of operation on January 10, 2020. The ride then closed January 11.

When SeaWorld Orlando reopened in June 2020 after the COVID pandemic closure, Wild Arctic remained closed. It closed on March 16, 2020 after its last operating day on March 15. The exhibit stayed open (containing all the animals), but the ride (and the non-motion theater) could not be accessed. As of January 2022, the ride has not announced a reopening date.

Former Attraction summary

Entrance
Guests queued outside the "Franklin Exploration Center", where it was presumed that they were waiting to board a helicopter which took them to "Base Station: Wild Arctic". The queue outside the attraction included numerous murals of the Arctic animals and scenery as well as various HD TV monitors that showed various clips about the Arctic and its animals running on a loop. Guests then entered the show building.

Gate boarding rooms
Once inside the building, guests were divided into either traveling by helicopter (the ride portion) or traveling by foot / walking (in which they viewed the ride film without the motion). Guests who required stationary seating were taken directly to a Gate Boarding Room B where they viewed the ride film and then the interactive animal exhibit.

Guests experiencing the actual ride were taken into a room with an information board showing the flight departure schedule, as well as a large projection screen in front of them which showed another random clip about facts of the Arctic. From here, guests entered the pre-flight boarding station where they lined up into multiple rows to prepare for their helicopter flight. Soon, a video came on the screen in which the Operations Coordinator for the Franklin Exploration Center explained that the center is a support facility for Base Station Wild Arctic, and that both facilities were founded by Thomas Purcell in 1937, who strived to have man survive in the Arctic climate to research the area. The Coordinator further explained that guests would be traveling to Base Station Wild Arctic in the White Thunder helicopter. A brief restriction spiel was played before she then turned the show over to Co-Pilot Norm "Snowman" Miller, played by comedian/actor Rick Ducommun. Miller began to explain that the White Thunder was being piloted by Captain Emerson, but was interrupted by White Thunder's computer, which warned of a severe arctic storm in their path. Miller then explained the safety rules to guests, and ended the video. The doors to White Thunder then opened, and guests boarded the ride vehicle via a drawbridge-style ramp.

The pre-show was removed in San Diego and was updated with a new pre-show explaining animals in the attraction then turned to a crew member for safety information. The ride itself was not altered and stayed the same.

Ride

Once guests were seated and secured seat belts, the doors closed, and Captain Emerson began departing White Thunder from the Franklin Exploration Center, and explained to guests that he expected a short, comfortable flight to Base Station "Wild Arctic". Soon, Emerson began flying the helicopter down to observe a polar bear family and then piloted White Thunder to switch to a water mode to dive into the Arctic waters to observe some Narwhals. Soon after the helicopter was piloted above water again, where Emerson warned that the Arctic storm was picking up and he had a warning indicator on his computer. Emerson landed the helicopter on a glacier to check the problem, which soon began breaking apart due to the weight of the jet. Emerson struggled to get the engine to start, and the helicopter was soon caught in a rock slide before it began flying again. The computer then died out, and Emerson decided to use a shortcut to Base Station Wild Arctic to avoid the storm. Soon, White Thunder was caught in an avalanche and ice flow until Emerson narrowly escaped the storm by piloting through a narrow cavern, and to safety. The jet then arrived at Base Station Wild Arctic, and Emerson thanked guests and bids them farewell as they explored the research station. The doors then opened, and guests exited the ride into Base Station Wild Arctic.

Animal Exhibit

Guests enter Base Station Wild Arctic, which consists of a re-created Arctic Research Station built around two sailing ships which are trapped in the ice. The story surrounding the ships are taken from the 1845 expedition of Captain John Franklin and his ships, HMS Erebus and HMS Terror. It has been one of the enduring mysteries of Arctic exploration: What happened to the two ships commanded by Captain John Franklin of Britain's Royal Navy after he set off in 1845 to find a route to Asia through the Northwest Passage? On September 7 the mystery was partially solved when an expedition led by the Canadian government found one of the ships, still relatively intact, resting on the bottom of Queen Maud Gulf in Canada’s Arctic. Numerous animals can be seen on exhibit at the base, including beluga whales, walruses, and harbor seals.  There were originally polar bears at the attraction, but SeaWorld has ceased collection of them. In the San Diego location, the polar bear habitat is currently occupied by two rescued sea otters. There are also multiple interactive cameras and activities scattered throughout the station. At the end of the exhibit, guests exit through a long series of ramps.

Gift shop
Following this area is a gift shop for the exhibit where arctic-themed and SeaWorld-themed merchandise can be purchased.

References

Amusement rides introduced in 1995
Amusement rides introduced in 1997
Amusement rides manufactured by Reflectone
SeaWorld San Diego
SeaWorld Orlando
Simulator rides